Jasmin Lord (born as Jasmin Gaßmann; 6 November 1989) is a German actress and film director of Colombian descent. She is well known for playing Rebecca von Lahnstein in German soap opera Verbotene Liebe. She will play Ximena in upcoming Croatian film about Ante Gotovina The General, together with Goran Višnjić and Armand Assante.

Filmography 
Ends meet (2008)
Verbotene Liebe (2008–2011)
Abrechnung mal anders (2011)
Honeymoon Hotel (2012)
Alarm für Cobra 11 – Die Autobahnpolizei (2012)
Radio Silence – Der Tod hört mit (2012)
 (2013)
 (2013)
Rosamunde Pilcher: Evitas Rache (2014)
 (2014)
Zazy (2016)
 (2016)
 (2016)
Vier gegen die Bank (2016)
Nord Nord Mord - Clüver und die wilde Nacht (2017)
Bullyparade - Der Film (2017)
The General (2018, Croatian film, starring with Goran Višnjić, Armand Assante, Zrinka Cvitešić)

References

External links 
 
 

1989 births
Living people
German film actresses
Actresses from Stuttgart
German television actresses
German people of Colombian descent
21st-century German actresses